The 2021 European Athletics U20 Championships were the 26th edition of the biennial European U20 athletics championships. They were held in Tallinn, Estonia from 15 July to 18 July. The 2021 European Athletics U23 Championships had been held in the same venue one week earlier, after Bergen renounced.

Medal summary

Men

Track

Field

Combined

Women

Track

Field

Combined

Medal table
Source:

 Not included in the official medal table.

Placing table
Results:
After 44 events.

Participation
1,230 athletes (624 men and 606 women) from 46 nations are expected to participate in these championships.

 (2)
 (3)
 (19)
 (24)
 (31)
 (23)
 (7)
 (13)
 (8)
 (53)
 (13)
 (39)
 (45)
 (59)
 (1)
 (95)
 (1)
 (67)
 (39)
 (41)
 (3)
 (33)
 (17)
 (87)
 (1)
 (23)
 (1)
 (12)
 (1)
 (3)
 (2)
 (1)
 (25)
 (41)
 (62)
 (18)
 (17)
 (1)
 (12)
 (20)
 (20)
 (70)
 (50)
 (41)
 (46)
 (40)

See also
 2021 European Athletics U23 Championships

References

External links
Official EAA site

Entries
Statistics handbook
Results book

European Athletics Junior Championships
International athletics competitions hosted by Estonia
European Athletics U20 Championships
European Athletics
European Athletics U20 Championships
Sports competitions in Tallinn
European Athletics U20 Championships